Pageant of Chinese History is a children's history book by Elizabeth Seeger. Focusing on political and cultural history, it covers the history of China from mythological times to the birth of the republic in 1912. The book, illustrated by Bernard Watkins, was first published in 1934 and was a Newbery Honor recipient in 1935.

References

1934 children's books
History books about China
American children's books
Newbery Honor-winning works
Children's history books